Three warships of Japan have borne the name :

 , a  destroyer launched in 1920, renamed Patrol Boat No.1 in 1940 and sunk in 1943.
 , a one-off World War II period super-destroyer launched in 1942 and sunk in 1944
 , a  guided missile destroyer commissioned in 1988 and operated by the Japan Maritime Self-Defense Force (JMSDF).

See also
 Shimakaze (CL-59), a  operated by the Japan Coast Guard (JCG).
 , a projected class of destroyers that was cancelled in 1942.

Imperial Japanese Navy ship names

Japanese Navy ship names